Christopher Norton Moore (born 1 June 1947)  is a British illustrator, particularly noted for his book covers, especially in the field of science fiction.

He has created cover images for works by many of the most famous authors in science fiction, including since 1998 the some of book covers for Orion Publishing's SF Masterworks series.

Non SF authors whose work he has provided covers for include Jeffrey Archer, Frederick Forsyth, Jackie Collins, Claire Francis, Jerzy Kosiński, Stephen Leather, Wilbur Smith, Terence Strong, Alastair Reynolds, Joseph Heller, and Colin Forbes.

In the 1970s he also created a number of album covers, for recording artists including Rod Stewart (The Vintage Years), the group Magnum, Journey, Fleetwood Mac (Penguin), The Allman Brothers Band, Lindisfarne (Magic in the Air and The News), Status Quo (Just Supposin'; 12 Gold Bars and Never Too Late), and Pentangle (Pentangling).

Collections

References

External links 
Biography from the artist's extensive website.

British illustrators
Science fiction artists
1947 births
Living people